Brasstown is the westernmost township, and one of the six townships of Clay County, North Carolina, United States. The other five are Hayesville, Hiawassee, Shooting Creek, Sweetwater, and Tusquittee. By area, it is the third smallest township in Clay County.

Geography
Brasstown has an elevation of 1,811.0 ft. (552.0 meters)

Unincorporated communities
Brasstown is home to four unincorporated communities, Fire's Creek, Warne and the town of the same name, Brasstown and Shewbird.

Adjacent townships

Churches and cemeteries

Cemeteries
Brasstown is home to four cemeteries: Brasstown Cemetery, Fires Creek Cemetery, Hunt Cemetery, and Mcclure Cemetery.

Churches
Brasstown also sports fifteen churches: Bethesda Church, Brasstown Church, Copperhill Church, Fires Creek Church, Hayesville Church, Many Forks Church, Martin Hill Church, Mount Pisgah Church, Myers Chapel, New Hope Church, Ogden Church, Pine Grove Church, Shady Grove Church, Sweetwater Church, and Truett Memorial Church.

Major highways
Highway 64

Townships in Clay County, North Carolina
Populated places on the Hiwassee River